Laurent Casanova (9 October 1906 — 20 March 1972) was a French politician and resistance fighter. He was a Communist deputy for Seine-et-Marne from 1945 to 1958 and Minister of Veterans and War Victims in 1946.

Biography

Political career
Born in Souk Ahras, Algeria and of Corsican origins, Casanova studied law at university in Paris. He became secretary of the Communist cell there, and he entered the underground apparatus of the French Communist Party (PCF) in 1928, when he was just twenty-one years old. By 1936, he had become a close associate of Maurice Thorez, the party's secretary-general. Drafted into the French armed forces in 1939, Casanova was promptly taken prisoner; however, he escaped and resumed contact with the party through an intermediary, Claudine Chomat, in March 1942.

Initially, he worked in the communist resistance with Pierre Villon, a period during which he met Pablo Picasso and Louis Aragon. He then served the National Military Committee of the FTP (Francs-Tireurs et Partisans), whose leader, Charles Tillon, proposed Casanova as the FTP's representative to the Provisional Consultative Assembly of 1944 in Algiers, but he never attended.

At the time of the liberation (August 1944), he was elected to be a delegate for Seine-et-Marne to two national constituent assemblies and then to the National Assembly of France itself, a position he held for the duration of the French Fourth Republic (1946–1958). He was Minister for Veterans and War Victims in the provisional governments of Félix Gouin and Georges Bidault from 26 January to 8 July 1946.

He became an associate member of the central committee of the French Communist Party (PCF) in July 1945 and then an alternate to the National Office in June 1947, and, lastly, a full member in June 1954, at the time of the Thirteenth Congress of the PCF. He represented the party in the Peace Movement, replacing Charles Tillon, who stepped down in 1952 (in connection with his association with André Marty). At the PCF, he was responsible for relations with intellectuals and with youth.

After the revelations of the Twentieth Congress of the Soviet Communist Party, during which Nikita Khrushchev denounced the "cult of personality" surrounding Joseph Stalin, Casanova became a Soviet representative to the governing bodies of PCF, a reaction favorable to Casanova based on a liberalizing change of style and thought in Russia. He had the support of Khrushchev he received the Lenin Peace Prize in 1960. However, Thorez managed to block the "aggiornamento" (trend to "bring things up to date") and eliminated Casanova from all governing bodies in May 1961. Marcel Servin and Maurice Kriegel-Valrimont were also victims of the purge.

Personal life
He married Danielle Casanova (born Vincentelli Perini), who died heroically at Auschwitz, and later, he married Claudine Chomat, whom he had also known, before the war, in the communist youth movement.

He died in Paris.

Works
Casanova published various different pamphlets and books. His most famous work is named The Communist Party, the intellectuals, and the nation.

Bibliography
Philip Robrieux devotes a few pages in his monumental biography of Maurice Thorez (4 volumes) to "The Inside Story of the French Communist Party" (V.2, p. 499–503 and V. 4, p. 126–127)

References
Philip Robrieux, Domestic History of the Communist Party, especially V. 2, p. 500 ff., also passim.

See also
French Communist Party
Servin-Casanova Case

1906 births
1972 deaths
People from Souk Ahras
People of French Algeria
Pieds-Noirs
French people of Corsican descent
French Communist Party politicians
French Ministers of Veterans Affairs
Members of the Constituent Assembly of France (1945)
Members of the Constituent Assembly of France (1946)
Deputies of the 1st National Assembly of the French Fourth Republic
Deputies of the 2nd National Assembly of the French Fourth Republic
Deputies of the 3rd National Assembly of the French Fourth Republic
French military personnel of World War II
Communist members of the French Resistance
Lenin Peace Prize recipients
Migrants from French Algeria to France